Antagonism may refer to:

The characteristic of an antagonist
Antagonism (chemistry), where the involvement of multiple agents reduces their overall effect
Receptor antagonist or pharmacological antagonist, a substance that binds to the site an agonist would bind to, without causing activation
Antagonism (phytopathology), an effect that suppresses the activity of a plant pathogen
Reflexive antagonism of muscles
 Intraspecific antagonism, disharmonious or antagonistic interaction between two individuals of the same species

See also
Antagonist (disambiguation)